Ogston Reservoir is a reservoir operated by Severn Trent Water in Derbyshire.  It is near the villages of Brackenfield and Ashover and the town of Clay Cross.

The reservoir takes its water from the River Amber and was originally created to supply the National Coal Board's Carbonisation Plant at Wingerworth; the reservoir now supplies water for the local area and is used as a holding ground for water for nearby Carsington Reservoir.  The reservoir covers 200 acres (800,000 m2) and holds 1.3 billion imperial gallons (5.9 billion litres) of water.

The valley was flooded in 1958 and completely submerged farmland, roads and part of the Ashover Light Railway.  The reservoir also destroyed most of the village of Woolley, including the Woolley House Hydro, the village store, the blacksmiths, the joiners, the laundry, the sheep dip and 'Napoleons Home', the local public house.  The villagers were relocated into council houses built in another local hamlet, Badger Lane, which eventually became known as the village of Woolley on the Moor, which subsequently became the present village of Woolley Moor.

The reservoir provides many leisure activities including sailing, windsurfing and trout-fishing. It is especially well known for its bird-life and over 200 species have been recorded at Ogston including Wilson's phalarope, Sabine's gull and long-tailed skuas.

Ellen MacArthur, best known as a solo long-distance yachtswoman who, on February 7, 2005, broke the world record for the fastest solo circumnavigation of the globe, trained to become a yachtswoman on Ogston Reservoir.

This article was prepared using information found on the website of the 'Woolley Trail', maintained by the local primary school.

References

Reservoirs in Derbyshire
Reservoirs of the Peak District
Drinking water reservoirs in England
Sites of Special Scientific Interest in Derbyshire